The Spătac is a left tributary of the river Târnava Mare in Romania. It discharges into the Târnava Mare in the village Spătac.

References

Rivers of Romania
Rivers of Alba County